Borazocine is a polar inorganic compound with the chemical formula B4H8N4. In this cyclic compound, the four BH units and four NH units alternate.

Related compounds

Borazine is a six-membered aromatic ring with three boron atoms and three nitrogen atoms.

See also
 1,2-Dihydro-1,2-azaborine 
 Cyclooctatetraene

References

Nitrogen heterocycles
Boron heterocycles
Eight-membered rings